The Cantata by Igor Stravinsky is a work for soprano, tenor, female choir, and instrumental ensemble (of two flutes, oboe, cor anglais (doubling second oboe), and cello), and was composed from April 1951 to August 1952. The premiere performance on 11 November 1952 was by the Los Angeles (Chamber) Symphony Society (to whom the work is dedicated), conducted by Stravinsky himself. After completing the opera The Rake's Progress, Stravinsky felt the urge to compose another work setting English words,  but in a non-dramatic form.

The piece consists of the following movements:

For his texts, Stravinsky chose four anonymous 15th- and 16th-century poems found in,, an anthology of poetry presented to him as a Christmas gift by W. H. Auden, the librettist of his opera The Rake's Progress.

The dirge sections concern a soul's approach to and journey through purgatory. In between the verses of the dirge there are two ricercars (Ricercar I sets "The maidens came"; Ricercar II sets the carol "Tomorrow shall be my dancing day"), and a sixteenth-century song text, "Westron Wind".

References

Further reading
 
 
 
 Garbutt, John, and Matthew Patterson. 1957. "An Approach to Stravinsky's 'Cantata' and 'The Wedding'". Music & Letters 38, no. 1 (January): 28–31.
 
 
 
 

Cantatas
Compositions by Igor Stravinsky
1952 compositions